Sir Bernard Christison Jenkin (born 9 April 1959) is a British Conservative Party politician serving as Member of Parliament (MP) for Harwich and North Essex since 2010. He also serves as chair of the Liaison Committee. He was first elected to represent Colchester North in 1992, and went on to represent North Essex before the Harwich and North Essex constituency was created.

Jenkin was elected chairman of the Public Administration Select Committee in May 2010. He is a long-standing critic of the European Union, believing that the EU undermines the United Kingdom's national sovereignty, and he was one of the Maastricht Rebels during the premiership of John Major. In the 2016 EU referendum he supported Brexit and from 2017 he was one of the most vocal supporters of the Eurosceptic pressure group Leave Means Leave.

Early life
Jenkin was born on 9 April 1959 to Patrick Jenkin (later Baron Jenkin of Roding), the life peer and former cabinet minister, and Monica Jenkin (née Graham). He is a male-line descendant of the scientist Fleeming Jenkin. He was educated at Highgate School, William Ellis School (also in Highgate) and Corpus Christi College, Cambridge, where he was awarded a choral exhibition and gained a BA honours degree in English literature in 1982.  He was President of the Cambridge Union Society in 1982. He worked for Ford and the private equity company 3i as Manager of Legal & General Ventures from 1989 to 1992. From 1992 to 1995, he was an advisor to Legal & General Group plc.

Parliamentary career
Declaring that he wanted to "illustrate that people in the south-east haven't forgotten about Scotland", Jenkin stood for election in Glasgow Central at the 1987 general election. At the 1992 general election he was elected as MP for Colchester North.

During John Major's government, Jenkin was one of the Maastricht Rebels who defied the party whip to oppose the Maastricht Treaty. When the Colchester North constituency was abolished for the 1997 general election, Jenkin was returned to the House of Commons for the newly-re-established North Essex constituency.

William Hague appointed him Shadow Minister for Transport (1998–2001). He has also served as Shadow Secretary of State for Defence (2001–2003) under Iain Duncan Smith and Shadow Regions Secretary (2003–2005) under Michael Howard. He has also been Shadow Energy Minister.

Jenkin was Deputy Chairman of the Conservative Party, and had responsibility for candidates, until 7 November 2006, when this role was given to John Maples. Jenkin's deputy chairman role came to an end when, during a shadow cabinet reshuffle, he was offered another frontbench position, which he declined, reportedly saying to David Cameron that only a return to the shadow cabinet would interest him.

In 2006, Jenkin used racial descriptor "coloured" when referring to a British Asian Conservative A-List candidate, Ali Miraj.

Since May 2012, Jenkin has been consistently re-elected as an Executive of the 1922 Committee and remains an incumbent as of 6 Jul 2022.

Jenkin, who gained a reputation as a critic of the Coalition government, led calls to drop the House of Lords Reform Bill 2012. Jenkin voted in favour of same sex marriage in 2013 "as a matter of principle", whilst acknowledging the decision to hold the debate caused much "political unhappiness".

In January 2014, Jenkin drafted a letter calling for Prime Minister Cameron to renegotiate Britain's relationship with the EU to give the House of Commons powers to veto EU legislation, which was ultimately signed by 95 MPs, and reportedly backed by another six. Following the Scottish independence referendum and promises made to further devolve powers to Scotland, Jenkin called for the creation of an "English First Minister" and for departments responsible for policy that applied only in England to be accountable only to the English MPs.

Following the 2015 general election, he was returned unopposed as the chairman of the Public Administration and Constitutional Affairs Select Committee.

Jenkin was one of the most vocal supporters of the Eurosceptic pressure group Leave Means Leave.

In September 2019, Jenkin criticised the House of Commons speaker John Bercow, stating that he was "irretrievably politicised and radicalised". This comment came after Bercow made a speech warning Boris Johnson that "the only form of Brexit which we will have, whenever that might be, will be a Brexit that the House of Commons has explicitly endorsed".

In December 2019, Jenkin voted in favour of the withdrawal agreement.

Although a sceptic of lockdown, Jenkin supported the first COVID-19 tier regulations in England. However, he urged the prime minister to put forward a white paper on the issue, setting out how the UK can deal with COVID-19 through treatments, social distancing and an improved NHS Test and Trace.

In 2021, he was a critic of Russia, and urged the government to take action in Ukraine.

Expenses claims

In May 2009, Jenkin was reported by The Daily Telegraph to have used £50,000 in expenses to pay his sister-in-law rent on the property he uses as his constituency home. Jenkin claimed that he was just paying "an honest and reasonable rent" for the property. On 27 October 2009, it was initially recommended that Bernard Jenkin pay back £63,250 by expenses auditor Sir Thomas Legg. This is the highest amount known to have been recommended after an audit of MPs' claims on second homes expenses. His father ultimately settled the bill for him This amount was reduced to £36,250 following an appeal.

Combat Stress
Jenkin is the vice-president of the UK charity Combat Stress, which offers residential treatment to ex-servicemen and women suffering from posttraumatic stress disorder. To mark his 50th birthday, he held a fundraising event in March 2009 which raised over £50,000 for the charity.

In popular culture
Jenkin's role on the Public Administration and Constitutional Affairs Select Committee was dramatised in the 2017 verbatim musical Committee: (A New Musical), which retold the downfall of the charity Kids Company and which was first performed at the Donmar Warehouse. Jenkin was portrayed by actor Alexander Hanson.

Jenkin was portrayed by Tim McMullan in the 2019 Channel 4 drama Brexit: The Uncivil War.

Personal life
Jenkin married Anne Strutt in 1988 and has two sons. He is an occasional naturist, and a long-time acquaintance of screenwriter Richard Curtis, who typically includes a character named 'Bernard' in everything he writes.

Jenkin contracted COVID-19 in March 2022.

Honours
In 2018, Jenkin was awarded with a knighthood honouring his political and public service.

Awards
Jenkin is in favour of marriage equality and was nominated for a Stonewall award in 2013. The environment is one of his main policy concerns: The Climate Coalition awarded him the Green Heart Hero Award for his eco-friendly lifestyle choices.

Notes

References

External links

 Bernard Jenkin MP official website
 
 Bernard Jenkin CV
 Bernard Jenkin MP biography at the site of the Conservative Party
 ePolitix.com – Bernard Jenkin
 Guardian Unlimited Politics – Ask Aristotle: Bernard Jenkin MP
 BBC News – Bernard Jenkin  profile 20 June 2006

Video clips

News items
 2006 reshuffle
 Use of the racial descriptor "Coloured"
 Laptop stolen in 2002

|-

|-

|-

|-

|-

|-

1959 births
3i Group people
Alumni of Corpus Christi College, Cambridge
Conservative Party (UK) MPs for English constituencies
Living people
People educated at Highgate School
People educated at William Ellis School
People from Essex
Presidents of the Cambridge Union
Spouses of life peers
UK MPs 1992–1997
UK MPs 1997–2001
UK MPs 2001–2005
UK MPs 2005–2010
UK MPs 2010–2015
UK MPs 2015–2017
UK MPs 2017–2019
UK MPs 2019–present
Sons of life peers
Knights Bachelor
Politicians awarded knighthoods
British Eurosceptics